This is a list of women writers who were born in New Zealand or whose lives and works are closely associated with that country.

A

B

C

D

E

F

G

H

I

J

K

L

M

N

O

P

Q

R

S

T

U
Makerita Urale (fl. 1990s), playwright, producer and documentary director

W

Y
Sonja Yelich (born 1965), poet

See also
 List of New Zealand writers
 List of New Zealand poets
 List of New Zealand women artists
 List of New Zealand women photographers

-
New Zealand women writers, List of
Writers, List of New Zealand
Women writers, List of New Zealand